Patrick Ross Broadfoot (born 8 March 1985) is an English rugby union player from Lewisham, London, England who currently plays for National League 2 South side Old Elthamians as a Fly-half.  He has experience of English rugby union from the fourth tier (National League 2 South) right up to the Premiership.

Early life 
Broadfoot was educated at Whitgift School in Croydon before moving to the University of Cambridge. He also plays cricket.

Career 
Broadfoot started playing rugby for Whitgift School, where he won the U15 Daily Mail Cup in 1999, before he was signed to London Irish's academy where he quickly rose through it, eventually becoming part of the London Irish squad while still a student at Cambridge University. From there, he moved to Leicester Tigers and played for their first team in the English Premiership as well as playing on loan for Bedford Blues. After a lack of opportunities at Leicester, in 2008 he moved to Cambridge University R.U.F.C., where he became captain in the same year, in order to focus more on his studies.  While playing for Cambridge he also managed to make a brief return to his original club, London Irish, where he was called up to provide cover to the first team squad.  In 2010 after graduating from Cambridge University, Broadfoot moved to Richmond F.C. in order to also work as a commodities trader in London. In 2011, he moved to Jersey where despite Jersey being a full-time club, Broadfoot remained a part-time player. In his debut season for Jersey, Broadfoot, along with fellow Jersey player Michael Le Bourgeois, was listed as one of the top ten kickers in National League 1 and helped his club win the league title and promotion to the Championship.  In 2013 as Jersey moved towards becoming a fully professional championship team, Broadfoot decided to take a year out of the game and left the club.  In 2015 Broadfoot made a return to league rugby, signing for Old Elthamians in National League 2 South.

Representative career 
Broadfoot has represented England Group Schools between 1999-2001. In addition, he has represented England under-18s He has also represented England at under-19 and under-21 level. While at university, Broadfoot represented Cambridge in their Varsity Match against Oxford University.  In 2012 he was called up to play for the Barbarians.

Honours

Youth/School Rugby
Daily Mail Cup (U15) winner (Whitgift School): 1999

Jersey
National League 1 champions: 2011-12
Siam Cup winners: 2012

References 

Rugby union fly-halves
People from Lewisham
Alumni of the University of Cambridge
1985 births
Living people
Jersey Reds players
Leicester Tigers players
London Irish players
Richmond F.C. players
English rugby union players
Rugby union players from London